Joshua "Jack" Harris (5 November 1891 – 1966) was a Scottish professional football player and manager. He made over 400 English Football League appearances in the years before and after the First World War.

Career
Born in Glasgow, Harris played as a winger in the Football League for Burnley, Bristol City, Leeds United and Fulham. During World War I he made some appearances in the Scottish Football League which continued to operate, whereas the English leagues were suspended.

He later became a football manager, coaching French team RC Lens between 1934 and 1935.

His brother Neil and nephew John were also professional footballers.

References

Footballers from Glasgow
Scottish footballers
Scottish football managers
Scottish expatriate football managers
Association football midfielders
Burnley F.C. players
Partick Thistle F.C. players
Clydebank F.C. (1914) players
Vale of Clyde F.C. players
Ashfield F.C. players
British Army personnel of World War I
Bristol City F.C. players
Leeds United F.C. players
Scottish expatriate sportspeople in France
Expatriate football managers in France
Fulham F.C. players
English Football League players
Scottish Junior Football Association players
Scottish Football League players
1891 births
1966 deaths
Date of death missing
Place of death missing